Foundering may refer to:
Shipwrecking, the sinking of a ship
Foundered strata, the collapse of rock strata